Tara Anne Fonseca is an Indian model and winner of the Miss Asia Pacific 1973 contest. She was the winner of the beauty pageant Miss Asia Pacific 1973, the second Indian to win this title after Zeenat Aman in 1970.

Early and personal life
Fonseca was born in Bangalore, Karnataka. 

She married Victor Menezes, an engineer and banker.

Career 
Fonesca was the second runner-up of the annual Femina Miss India competition in 1973. Becoming third in the competition gave her access to participate in the Miss Asia Pacific contest of 1973. In which she was crowned Miss Asia Pacific 1973 by outgoing titleholder Janet Coutts of Australia at the end of the event. Fourteen countries participated in the event. It was held on May 31, 1973 in Manila, Philippines.

References

Miss Asia Pacific International winners
1973 beauty pageants
Living people
Year of birth missing (living people)